Dan McGrath is an American television writer, educator and stage director. He is known primarily for his work as a writer/producer for several TV series including The Simpsons, Saturday Night Live, King of the Hill, Gravity Falls and Mission Hill.

He was nominated for an Emmy for his work on Saturday Night Live, and later won an Emmy for his work on The Simpsons.  He was nominated for a Writers Guild Award for "Life: A Loser's Manual".

Early life 
McGrath was raised in Brooklyn, New York, the son of Gerard McGrath, a machinist and electrician, and Eleanor McGrath, a homemaker.  He is of Irish, Hungarian, and Scandinavian descent.

He attended Regis High School  and Harvard University, where he studied Chinese and Japanese history and politics.  He failed all his Japanese-language courses, but was active as a writer, editor and cartoonist at The Harvard Lampoon, where he was twice elected a vice president, and somehow managed to graduate with honors.

While at Harvard, Dan also designed computer games at MIT and co-founded (along with Bill Rauch, Lisa Latham, Amy Brenneman and Dean Norris) the notorious avant-garde theatre company The Kronauer Group, which later became the Cornerstone Theater Company.

He worked in hospitals, public clinics and emergency rooms for a number of years, and then moved onto Hollywood.

He is a founder and co-chairman of Tamaribuchi Heavy Manufacturing Concern.

Television 
Dan started his television career as a writer at Saturday Night Live, where he was a frequent collaborator with Adam Sandler and Chris Farley.  He then joined the writing staff of The Simpsons, contributing things like "The Devil and Homer Simpson" and "Time and Punishment" (both co-written with Greg Daniels) and "Bart of Darkness".

Entertainment Weekly called the "Time and Punishment" segment "one of the most beautifully random moments in [The] Simpsons history".

The A.V. Club called McGrath's "Boy-Scoutz 'n the Hood" episode "pretty much comic gold from start to finish" and "utterly fantastic" and said it "features one of the greatest, most true-to-life depictions of a bender/drug binge in television history".

They also said Dan's episode "Bart of Darkness" "is a hilarious episode that restricts a Simpsons''' go-to—Bart as hell-raiser—and mines much of its humor from the cruelties of childhood."

After getting fired twice from The Simpsons, he later worked on Mission Hill (where he wrote "I Married a Gay Man from Outer Space"). He also worked on Gravity Falls, The PJs, and a nearly decade-long stint at King of the Hill, contributing episodes like "Full Metal Dust Jacket" and "The Minh Who Knew Too Much". The A.V. Club called "The Minh Who Knew Too Much" episode "terrifyingly silly and haphazard".

 Theater 
At Harvard he was a prolific stage director: he directed Richard III in a dining hall, using only the tables and chairs as a set, and he once covered the entire Loeb Main Stage'' in dirt for "Richard's Cork Leg".  They are still cleaning up the dirt he left there from 1985.

Tutorial 
Recently Dan taught a course in "Comedy and Cultural Theory" at The Center for Fiction in Brooklyn.

Writing credits

The Simpsons episodes
He wrote (or co-wrote) the following episodes:
 "Treehouse of Horror IV" (co-wrote "The Devil and Homer Simpson" with Greg Daniels) (1993)
 "Boy-Scoutz 'n the Hood" (1993)
 "Bart of Darkness" (1994)
 "Treehouse of Horror V" (co-wrote "Time and Punishment" with Greg Daniels) (1994)

References

External links
 
 Dan McGrath at WikiSimpsons

Living people
American television writers
American male television writers
The Harvard Lampoon alumni
Emmy Award winners
Place of birth missing (living people)
Year of birth missing (living people)